Nikolai Valuev vs. David Haye, billed as "David vs Goliath", was a professional boxing match contested on 7 November 2009 for the WBA heavyweight championship.

Background
After regaining the WBA title with a unanimous decision over fellow former Champion John Ruiz, Nikolai Valuev had made one defence gaining a very controversial majority decision over Evander Holyfield, he agreed to "Champion in Recess" Ruslan Chagaev, who had given Valuev the only defeat of career. However their fight on 30 May 2009 in Helsinki, Finland at the Hartwall Arena, was cancelled when Chagaev was declared medically unfit after failing a Finnish medical test, allegedly due to hepatitis, although he would go on to face Wladimir Klitschko in June losing via a 9th round RTD.

Haye had moved to the Heavyweight division after he had unified the WBA, WBC & WBO cruiserweight titles against Enzo Maccarinelli, knocking out Monte Barrett in November 2008. He was first set to face WBC Champion Vitali Klitschko, then Haye agreed to face his brother Wladimir, however he pulled out with a back injury and was replaced with Chagaev. 

In July Valuev and Haye agreed to meet in November, despite John Ruiz claiming that he had inherited the mandatory status from Chagaev as the next highest ranked contender. He would later agree to face the winner of Valuev vs Haye.

The fight
Haye was able to outmove and outbox the much slower Valuev by using a circle, stick and move strategy, which would give a majority decision victory. Haye suffered a broken hand during the fight while hitting Valuev's head, saying it was like hitting a brick wall. The win made Haye the fourth Briton to win a major heavyweight title, after Bob Fitzsimmons, Lennox Lewis, and Frank Bruno, as well as only the second former cruiserweight champion to win a heavyweight title after Evander Holyfield.

Aftermath
Valuev would retire after the fight, while Haye would agree to face Ruiz in a mandatory defence.

Undercard
Confirmed bouts:

Broadcasting

References

2009 in boxing
World Boxing Association heavyweight championship matches
Boxing in Germany
2009 in German sport
November 2009 sports events in Europe
Sports competitions in Nuremberg
Boxing matches